Natasha Sofía Rosas López (born 21 August 1993) is a Venezuelan professional footballer who plays as a defensive midfielder for Brazilian club AE 3B da Amazônia and the Venezuela women's national team.

Club career
Rosas is a former player of Deportivo Anzoátegui and Hermanos Páez.

International career
Rosas represented Venezuela at the 2010 FIFA U-17 Women's World Cup. At senior level, she played a friendly match against Colombia in 2017.

References

1993 births
Living people
People from Cumaná
Venezuelan women's footballers
Women's association football midfielders
Women's association football fullbacks
Deportivo Anzoátegui players
Patriotas Boyacá footballers
Independiente Santa Fe (women) players
Campeonato Brasileiro de Futebol Feminino Série A1 players
Venezuela women's international footballers
Venezuelan expatriate women's footballers
Venezuelan expatriate sportspeople in Colombia
Expatriate women's footballers in Colombia
Venezuelan expatriate sportspeople in Brazil
Expatriate women's footballers in Brazil